Norrbotten NEO is a Swedish chamber ensemble dedicated to contemporary classical music. The ensemble was formed 2007 and is based in the concert hall Studio Acusticum in Piteå, Sweden. NEO regularly collaborates with contemporary composers and commission new works on a yearly basis. The repertoire includes music by composers like Henrik Strindberg and Per Mårtensson. The ensemble receives financial support from "The Swedish Arts Council", "Norrbotten county council" as well as "Luleå- and Piteå municipality". The ensemble have toured both in Sweden and abroad.

Members in NEO:

Brusk Zanganeh
 
Kim Hellgren

Nikolay Shugaev

Sara Hammarström

Robert Ek

Mårten Landström

Daniel Saur

Selected repertoire

Bach, J S	Goldberg canons
Berg, Alban	4 pieces op. 5
Borisova-Ollas, Victoria	Behind the Shadows
Boulez, Pierre	Improvisé-pour le Dr. K.
Byström, Britta	Revolt i grönska
Chini, André	La Princesse de Babylone
Hammerth, Johan	Preludium no.3
Hedelin, Fredrik	Trio
Hillborg, Anders	Kongsgaard Variations
Hultqvist, Anders	Light Winter Light
Karkoff, Ingvar	Bortbytingen
Kurtág, György	Bagatellen Op. 14
Leroux, Philippe	AAA
Lysell, Mattias	Gilded Splinters 3.0
Messiaen, Olivier	Quatuor pour la Fin du Temps
Monnakgotla, Tebogo	Toys (or the wonderful world of Clara)
Mozart, W A	Flute Quartett K. 285
Mundry, Isabel	Die Vorüberlaufenden
Murail, Tristan	Garrigue
Mårtensson, Per	Quartet
Nilsson, Anders	Divertimento f chamber ensemble
Nilsson, Bo	Schlagfiguren
Nordin, Jesper	Surfaces Scintillantes
Piazolla, Astor	Tango Sensations
Ramström, Johan	10 december ur "Ett helt liv en vinter"
Ravel, Maurice	Chansons madécasses
Reich, Steve	Double Sextet
Romitelli, Fausto	Nell’alto dei Giorni Immobili
Saariaho, Kaija	Serenatas
Staern, Benjamin   Hilma Scenes
Takemitsu, Toru	A bird came down the walk

Sources 
 Info from Made festival
 (Info in swedish)

External links 
 Official webpage

Contemporary classical music in Sweden